Smith's woolly bat (Kerivoula smithii) is a species of vesper bat in the family Vespertilionidae.
It is found in Cameroon, Democratic Republic of the Congo, Kenya, Nigeria, and Uganda.
Its natural habitats are subtropical or tropical dry forests, subtropical or tropical moist lowland forests, subtropical or tropical swamps, and subtropical or tropical moist montane forests.

References

Kerivoulinae
Taxonomy articles created by Polbot
Mammals described in 1880
Taxa named by Oldfield Thomas
Bats of Africa